Inkwenkwezi Private Game Reserve, is located approximately 30 km north-east of East London, and is situated within an area of 4500 hectares encompassing five different biomes in the Wild Coast region of South Africa's Eastern Cape province. It is home to four of the Big Five game; namely lion, buffalo, leopard and rhinoceros; as well as giraffe, zebra, a variety of antelope, and many other smaller species.

History 

Inkwenkwezi, which translates from Xhosa to mean "under the stars", grew out of a dream of the Mthatha-born Stanton brothers, Graham and Keith. Graham Stanton purchased the first of several properties in the Chintsa valley area which were eventually combined to form Inkwenkwezi, in 1983.

Species 
 Inkwenkwezi is home to several lions most of which are extremely rare white lions. One of the tawny females carries 50% of the white gene and has had both brown and white litters.

See also
 List of protected areas of South Africa

External links 
 Global White Lion Protection Trust
 Eastern Cape Provincial Government
 Inkwenkwezi Website

Protected areas of the Eastern Cape